Pusat Bandar Puchong LRT station is a light rapid transit station at Puchong Town Centre, in Puchong, Selangor. It is operated under the Sri Petaling Line network, between Taman Perindustrian Puchong and IOI Puchong Jaya station. The station is located just beside the busy Damansara-Puchong Expressway (LDP). Like most other LRT stations operating in Klang Valley, this station is an elevated station, which consists of two side platforms.

The station is located near to Tesco Puchong and it is about 25 km south of Kuala Lumpur, the capital of Malaysia. A pedestrian bridge over Damansara-Puchong Expressway connects the station to Setia Walk. The station is also provides a direct link to Tesco Puchong via a pedestrian bridge. It mainly serves the residences from Taman Wawasan Puchong and Bandar Puteri Puchong. Shop lots can also be found near Tesco Puchong as well as Setia Walk.

The station is a part of the Sri Petaling Line Extension Project proposed in 2006. The station was opened on 31 March 2016 as a part of the second phase, which includes another 3 stations in Puchong.

History 
The extension of both Sri Petaling Line and Kelana Jaya Line were announced on 29 August 2006 by then Malaysian Deputy Prime Minister Mohd Najib Abdul Razak. This is also confirmed by then Prime Minister of Malaysia Tun Abdullah Badawi in his National Budget speech in 2006. The current site of the station was confirmed in 2007 and was initially named Bandar Metro Puchong station.

Construction started in 2010, while fault free test runs of the trains started on 22 January 2016. Although it faced some delays, the station was opened on 31 March 2016, as a part of the second phase of the extension.

The construction was complained to have caused damage on roads and shops to the nearby areas. The construction of the extension was said to have caused a flash flood in the area near the station. The slow progress of the construction was complained by residences nearby, and it had caused disruption to the shop owners nearby as it occupies the parking space provided in the area.

Incidents and accidents 
An Indian man was found dead 100 metres away from the station. Based on the station's CCTV footage, the man was walking on the track before he was hit by the train. The victim was pronounced dead at the scene. The accident had caused the service of the line to be disrupted to allow police to remove the body from the location.

In October 2018, the lift of the station broke down and caused disabled commuters to be stranded at the station as there is no alternative route for them. Prasarana later apologized and the lift was repaired by the next day.

Station

Station Layout 
Park-and-ride facilities are provided in the station with 120 parking bays built next to the station. A convenience store, operated by 7-Eleven as well as a cafe, can be found in the station. As a part of the initiative of making all stations accessible to the disabled, the station provides disabled-friendly facilities such as accessibility lifts, accessible toilets, special gate entrance for wheelchair users and tactile paving provided throughout the station. The platform gap is reduced to minimum to allow easy boarding for wheelchair users.

Green Practices 
As part of a green initiative launched by Prasarana, the station includes several green practices. Energy-efficient lights and rainwater harvesting systems were installed, and the glass louvers were designed to allow sunlight into the stations. The construction of the station utilized sustainable materials and recycling practices.

Entrances and Exits
Pusat Bandar Puchong LRT station has a total of two entrances/exits, one heading towards Lotus's Puchong, another leads to Setia walk.

Bus Services

Local/Feeder buses

Trunk buses

Notes

References

External links 

Pusat Bandar Puchong LRT Station - KL MRT Line Integrations

Ampang Line
Railway stations opened in 2016